T. J. Bass, real name Thomas J. Bassler, MD (July 7, 1932 – December 13, 2011) was an American science fiction author and physician, having graduated from the University of Iowa in 1959. Bassler is also known for his controversial claim that nonsmokers who are able to complete a marathon in under four hours can eat whatever they wish and never suffer a fatal heart attack.
 
John Robbins has noted that Jim Fixx approvingly quoted Bassler in his best-selling book, The Complete Book of Running. Fixx died from heart failure at 52 while running.

Two of Bass' novels, Half Past Human (1971) and The Godwhale (1974), were nominated for the Nebula Award. In both his books the Hive was a three trillion population of 'nebishes' - humans who had four toes and all aggressiveness bred out of them.

Bibliography
Science fiction novels (as T. J. Bass)
Half Past Human (1971, fix-up)
The Godwhale (1974)
Short stories
Star Itch (1968) If magazine
Star Seeder (1969) If magazine
Half Past Human  (1969) Galaxy Science Fiction, Vol.29 No.4
G.I.T.A.R (or "Song of Kaia") (1970) If magazine, Nov–Dec
A Game of Biochess (1970) If magazine, Feb
Rorqual Maru (1972) Galaxy Science Fiction, Vol.32 No.4
Non fiction (as Thomas J. Bassler)
The Whole Life Diet: An Integrated Program of Nutrition and Exercise for a Lifestyle of Total Health (1979), with Robert E. Burger

References

External links

1932 births
2011 deaths
20th-century American novelists
American male novelists
American science fiction writers
Writers from Clinton, Iowa
American male short story writers
20th-century American short story writers
20th-century American male writers
Novelists from Iowa
Physicians from Iowa
20th-century pseudonymous writers